99th Dream is the fourth studio album by the British alternative rock band Swervedriver, released in 1998. The band was dropped by DGC Records after recording the album; they retained the masters and eventually signed with Zero Hour Records.

Critical reception
Entertainment Weekly wrote that "the sheer heaviness of the old Swervies is much missed, but even on cruise control the band has a singular intensity, not to mention a sharp sense of songcraft." MTV called the album "packed with odes to psychedelia and mesmerizing sonic displays that draw heavily from [Swervedriver's] post-punk past." The Quietus praised the "warm, spacey psychedelia and classic pop hooks." CMJ New Music Monthly wrote that "the band's ability to strike a balance between restraint and reckless abandon is way more impressive than even the catchiest of melodies."

Track listing

Personnel
Adam Franklin – guitars and vocals
Jimmy Hartridge – guitars and vocals
Steve George – bass guitar
Jez Hindmarsh – drums
Adam-	Sleeve Art
Nick Addison-  Engineer, Mixing
Andy Allen- Photography
Mark Aubrey-	Mixing, Mixing Assistant
Jamal Chalabi-	Unknown Contributor Role
Swervedriver-	Composer, Mixing, Primary Artist, Producer
Duncan Swift-	Unknown Contributor Role
Marc Waterman-	Mixing
Paul Watson-	Photography, Sleeve Art
Catherine Wessel-	Photography
Robert Fisher-	Photography
Graham Hogg-	Mixing, Mixing Assistant
Jez-	 Drums, Engineer, Multi Instruments
Ian Laughton-	Unknown Contributor Role
George Marino-	Mastering
Dick Meaney-	Engineer
Stephen Molloy-	Unknown Contributor Role
Alan Moulder-	Mixing, Producer
Matthew Sime-	Engineer

References

External links

99th Dream at YouTube (streamed copy where licensed)

1998 albums
Swervedriver albums
Albums produced by Alan Moulder
Zero Hour Records albums